Henry Sampson may refer to:

 Henry Sampson (English cricketer) (1813–1885), English cricketer
 Henry Sampson (newspaper proprietor) (1841–1891), English newspaper proprietor
 Henry Sampson (New Zealand cricketer) (1947–1999), New Zealand cricketer
 Henry Sampson (physician) (1629–1700), English nonconformist minister and physician
 Henry Sampson (provost), Provost of Oriel College, Oxford, 1449–1476
 Henry Sampson Woodfall (1739–1805), British printer and journalist
 Henry T. Sampson (1934–2015), American engineer, inventor, and film historian
 Henry William Sampson (1872–1938), English-born South African politician and trade unionist

See also
Henry Samson (ca. 1603–1685), English passenger on the Mayflower
Henry Simpson (disambiguation)